In Canada, a deputy premier is the deputy head of government of a province or territory. As of 2022, every province and territory, with the exception of New Brunswick, currently has a deputy premier.

List of current Canadian deputy premiers

See also 
Deputy Prime Minister of Canada
Deputy Premier of British Columbia
Deputy Premier of Manitoba
Deputy Premier of Ontario
Deputy Premier of Prince Edward Island
Deputy Premier of Quebec

References

Deputy premiers of Canadian provinces and territories